Nanzhao (also spelled Nanchao) was a dynastic kingdom that flourished in what is now southern China and northern Southeast Asia during the 8th and 9th centuries. It was centered on present-day Yunnan in China.

History

Origins

Nanzhao encompassed many ethnic and linguistic groups. Some historians believe that the majority of the population were the Bai people and the Yi people, but that the elite spoke a variant of Nuosu (also called Yi), a Northern Loloish language.  Scriptures unearthed from Nanzhao were written in the Bai language. The Cuanman people came to power in Yunnan during Zhuge Liang's Southern Campaign in 225. By the fourth century they had gained control of the region, but they rebelled against the Sui dynasty in 593 and were destroyed by a retaliatory expedition in 602. The Cuan split into two groups known as the Black and White Mywa. The White Mywa (Baiman) tribes, who are considered the predecessors of the Bai people, settled on the fertile land of western Yunnan around the alpine fault lake Erhai. The Black Mywa (Wuman), considered to be predecessors of the Yi people, settled in the mountainous regions of eastern Yunnan. These tribes were called Mengshe (蒙舍), Mengxi (蒙嶲), Langqiong (浪穹), Tengtan (邆賧), Shilang (施浪), and Yuexi (越析). Each tribe was known as a zhao. In academia, the ethnic composition of the Nanzhao kingdom's population has been debated for a century. Some non-Chinese scholars subscribed to the theory that the Tai ethnic group was a major component and later moved south into modern-day Thailand and Laos. The historiography of the origins of Nanzhao people has attracted much interest.

Founding
In 649, the chieftain of the Mengshe tribe, Xinuluo (細奴邏, Senola), son of Jiadupang and grandson of Shelong, founded the Great Meng (大蒙) and took the title of Qijia Wang (奇嘉王; "Outstanding King"). He acknowledged Tang suzerainty. In 652, Xinuluo absorbed the White Mywa realm of Zhang Lejinqiu, who ruled Erhai Lake and Cang Mountain. This event occurred peacefully as Zhang made way for Xinuluo of his own accord. The agreement was consecrated under an iron pillar in Dali. Thereafter the Black and White Mywa acted as warriors and ministers respectively. Xinuluo was succeeded by his son, Luoshengyan, who travelled to Chang'an to make tribute to the Tang dynasty. In 704 the Tibetan Empire made the White Mywa tribes into vassals or tributaries. In 713, Luoshengyan was succeeded by his son, Shengluopi, who was also on good terms with the Tang. He was succeeded by his son, Piluoge, in 733.

Piluoge began expanding his realm in the early 730s. He first annexed the neighboring zhao of Mengsui, whose ruler, Zhaoyuan, was blind. Piluoge supported Zhaoyuan's son, Yuanluo, in his accession, and in turn weakened Mengsui. After Zhaoyuan was assassinated, Piluoge drove Yuanluo from Mengsui and annexed the territory. The remaining  banded together against Piluoge, who thwarted them with an alliance with the Tang dynasty. Not long after 733, the Tang official Yan Zhenghui cooperated with Piluoge in a successful attack on the zhao of Shilang, and rewarded the Mengshe rulers with titles.

Two other  also joined in the attack on Shilang: Dengdan ruled by Mieluopi and Langqiong ruled by Duoluowang. Piluoge moved to eliminate these competitors by bribing Wang Yu, the military governor of Jiannan (modern Sichuan) to convince the Tang court to support him in uniting the Six Zhaos. Piluoge then made a surprise attack on Dengdan and defeated the forces of both Mieluopi and the ruler of Shilang, Shiwangqian. The zhao of Yuexi was annexed when its ruler, Bochong, was murdered by his wife's lover, Zhangxunqiu. Zhangxunqiu was summoned by the Tang court and beaten to death. The territory of Yuexi was bestowed to Piluoge. Bochong's son, Yuzeng, fled and resisted Nanzhao's expansion for some time before he was defeated by Piluoge's son, Geluofeng, and drowned in the Changjiang. Piluoge's step-grandson grew jealous of the preeminence of his step-father, Geluofeng, and sought to create his own zhao by allying with the Tibetan Empire. His plans leaked out and he was killed.

In the year 737 AD, Piluoge (皮羅閣) united the Six Zhaos in succession, establishing a new kingdom called Nanzhao (Southern Zhao). In 738, the Tang granted Piluoge the title of "Prince of Yunnan". Piluoge set up a new capital at Taihe in 739, (the site of modern-day Taihe village, a few miles south of Dali). Located in the heart of the Erhai valley, the site was ideal: it could be easily defended against attack and it was in the midst of rich farmland. Under the reign of Piluoge, the White Mywa were removed from eastern Yunnan and resettled in the west. The Black and White Mywa were separated to create a more solidified caste system of ministers and warriors.

Territorial expansion
Piluoge died in 748, and was succeeded by his son Geluofeng (閣羅鳳).
When the Chinese prefect of Yunnan attempted to rob Nanzhao envoys in 750, Geluofeng attacked, killing the prefect and seizing nearby Tang territory. 
In retaliation, the Tang governor of Jiannan (modern Sichuan), Xianyu Zhongtong, attacked Nanzhao with an army of 80,000 soldiers in 751. He was defeated by Duan Jianwei (段俭魏) with heavy losses (many due to disease) at Xiaguan. Duan Jianwei's grave is two kilometres west of Xiaguan, and the Tomb of Ten Thousand Soldiers is located in Tianbao Park.
In 754, another Tang army of 100,000 soldiers, led by General Li Mi (李宓), approached the kingdom from the north, but never made it past Mu'ege. By the end of 754, Geluofeng had established an alliance with the Tibetans against the Tang that would last until 794. In the same year, Nanzhao gained control of the salt marshes of Yanyuan County, which it used to regulate the salt to its people, a practice that would continue during the reign of the Dali kingdom.

Geluofeng accepted a Tibetan title and acted as part of the Tibetan Empire. His successor, Yimouxun, continued the pro-Tibetan policy. In 779, Yimouxun participated in a large Tibetan attack on the Tang dynasty. However the burden of having to support every single Tibetan military campaign against the Tang soon weighed on him. In 794, he severed ties with Tibet and switched sides to the Tang. In 795, Yimouxun attacked a Tibetan stronghold in Kunming. The Tibetans retaliated in 799 but were repelled by a joint Tang-Nanzhao force. In 801 Nanzhao and Tang forces defeated a contingent of Tibetan and Abbasid slave soldiers. More than 10,000 Tibetan soldiers were killed and some 6,000 captured. Nanzhao captured seven Tibetan cities and five military garrisons while more than a hundred fortifications were destroyed. This defeat shifted the balance of power in favor of the Tang and Nanzhao.

Attack on Sichuan
During the reign of Quanlongcheng (r.809-816), the ruler behaved without constraint, and was killed by Wang Cuodian, a powerful governor. The military generals in Nanzhao had become powerful after the victory in Tibet. Wang Cuodian installed a puppet ruler Quanlisheng. However, Quanlisheng quickly took power back three years later before he was himself replaced by Quanfengyou, with the aid of the generals. Quanfengyou and Wang Cuodian, who remained a powerful general, were instrumental in the expansion of Nanzhao territory. Nanzhao expanded into Myanmar,
conquering the Pyu city-states in the 820s, finally defeating the Tagaung Kingdom in 832.

In 829, Wang Cuodian attacked Chengdu, but withdrew the following year. Wang Cuodian's invasion was not to take Sichuan but to push its territorial boundaries north and take the resources south of Chengdu. The advance of Nanzhaos' army was almost unopposed; the attack took advantage of chaos created in Sichuan by its governor, Du Yuanying. Bilateral relations between Nanzhao and Tang became delicate, as Wang Cuodian refused to step retreat from Yizhou, saying that Nanzhao had remained a loyal tributary and was only punishing Du Yuanying at the request of Tang soldiers.

In the 830s, they conquered the neighboring kingdoms of Kunlun to the east and Nuwang to the south.

Invasion of Annan

In 846, Nanzhao raided the southern Tang circuit of Annan. Relations with the Tang broke down after the death of Emperor Xuanzong in 859, when the Nanzhao king Shilong treated Tang envoys sent to receive his condolences with contempt, and launched raids on Bozhou and Annan. Shilong also killed Wang Cuodian. To recruit for his wars, Shilong ordered all men over the age 15 to join the army. Anti-Tang locals allied with highland people, who appealed to Nanzhao for help, and as a result invaded the area in 860, briefly taking Songping before being driven out by a Tang army the next year. Prior to Li Hu's arrival, Nanzhao had already seized Bozhou. When Li Hu led an army to retake Bozhou, the Đỗ family gathered 30,000 men, including contingents from Nanzhao to attack the Tang. When Li Hu returned, he learned the Vietnamese rebels and Nanzhao had taken control over Annan out of his hand. In December 860, Songping fell to the rebels and Hu fled to Yongzhou. In summer 861, Li Hu retook Songping but Nanzhao forces moved around and seized Yongzhou. Hu was banished to Hainan island and was replaced by Wang Kuan.

Shilong attacked Annan again in 863, occupying it for three years. With the aid of locals, Nanzhao invaded with an army of 50,000 and besieged Annan's capital Songping in mid-January. On 20 January, the defenders led by Cai Xi killed a hundred of the besiegers. Five days later, Cai Xi captured, tortured, and killed a group of besiegers known as the Púzǐ or Wangjuzi (according to some historians, the Puzi were ancestors of the Wa people. Description about them is indefinite). A local official named Liang Ke was related to them, and defected as a result. On 28 January, a Nanzhao Buddhist monk, possibly from the Indian continent, was wounded by an arrow while strutting to and fro naked outside the southern walls. On 14 February, Cai Xi shot down 200 Puzi and over 30 horses using a mounted crossbow from the walls. By 28 February, most of Cai Xi's followers had perished, and he himself had been wounded several times by arrows and stones. The Nanzhao commander, Yang Sijin, penetrated the inner city. Cai Xi tried to escape by boat, but it capsized midstream, drowning him. The 400 remaining defenders wanted to flee as well, but could not find any boats, so they chose to make a last stand at the eastern gate. Ambushing a group of Nanzhao cavalry, they killed over 2,000 Nanzhao troops and 300 horses before Yang sent reinforcements from the inner city. After taking Songping, Nanzhao laid siege to Junzhou (modern Haiphong). A Nanzhao and rebel fleet of 4,000 men led by a native chieftain named Zhu Daogu (朱道古) was attacked by a local commander, who rammed their vessels and sank 30 boats, drowning them. In total, the invasion destroyed Chinese armies in Annan numbering over 150,000. Although initially welcomed by the locals in ousting Tang control, Nanzhao turned on them, ravaging the local population and countryside. Both Chinese and Vietnamese sources note that the Annanese locals fled to the mountains to avoid destruction. A government-in-exile for the protectorate was established in Haimen (near modern-day Hạ Long). Ten thousand soldiers from Shandong and all other armies of the Tang empire were called and concentrating at Halong Bay for reconquering Annan. A supply fleet of 1,000 ships from Fujian was organized.

Tang counterattack

The Tang launched a counterattack in 864 under Gao Pian, a general who had made his reputation fighting the Türks and the Tanguts in the north. In September 865, Gao's 5,000 troops surprised a Nanzhao army of 50,000 while they were collecting rice from the villages and routed them. Gao captured large quantities of rice, which he used to feed his army. A jealous governor, Li Weizhou, accused Gao of stalling to meet the enemy, and reported him to the throne. The court sent another general named Wang Yanqian to replace Gao. In the meantime, Gao had been reinforced by 7,000 men who arrived overland under the command of Wei Zhongzai. In early 866, Gao's 12,000 men defeated a fresh Nanzhao army and chased them back to the mountains. He then laid siege to Songping but had to leave command due to the arrival of Li Weizhou and Wang Yanqian. He was later reinstated after sending his aid, Zeng Gun, who went to the capital as his representative and explained his circumstances. Gao completed the retaking of Annan in fall 866, executing the enemy general, Duan Qiuqian, and beheading 30,000 of his men.

According to G. Evans in his final monograph The Tai Original Diaspora, there were probably a quite large number of indigenous Tai-speaking people in Northern Vietnam that threw their support for Nanzhao against the Chinese, and when the Chinese came back in 864, many Tai people were also victims of following Chinese suppression.

Siege of Chengdu
In 869, Shilong attacked Chengdu with the help of the Dongman tribe. The Dongman used to be an ally of the Tang during their wars against the Tibetan Empire in the 790s. Their service was rewarded with mistreatment by Yu Shizhen, the governor of Xizhou, who kidnapped Dongman tribesmen and sold them to other tribes. When the Nanzhao attacked Xizhou, the Dongman tribe opened the gates and welcomed them in.

Nanzhao invaded again in 874 and reached within 70 km of Chengdu, seizing Qiongzhou, however they ultimately retreated, being unable to take the capital.

End of territorial expansion
In 875, Gao Pian was appointed by the Tang to lead defenses against Nanzhao. He ordered all the refugees in Chengdu to return home. Gao led a force of 5,000 and chased the remaining Nanzhao troops to the Dadu River where he defeated them in a decisive battle, captured their armored horses, and executed 50 tribal leaders. He proposed to the court an invasion of Nanzhao with 60,000 troops. His proposal was rejected. Nanzhao forces were driven from the Bozhou region, modern Guizhou, in 877 by a local military force organized by the Yang family from Shanxi. This effectively ended Nanzhao's expansionist campaigns. Shilong died in 877.

Decline

Shilong's successor, Longshun, entered negotiations with the Tang for a marriage alliance, which was agreed to in 880. The marriage alliance never came to fruition owing to the Huang Chao rebellion. By the end of 880 the rebels had taken Luoyang and seized the Tong Pass. Longshun did not give up on the marriage however. In 883 he sent a delegation to Chengdu to fetch the Princess of Anhua. They brought with them one hundred rugs and carpets as betrothal gifts. The Nanzhao delegation was detained for two years due to a dispute in ceremony and failed to bring back the princess. In 897 Longshun was murdered by one of his own ministers. His successor, Shunhua, sent envoys to the Tang requesting restoration of friendly relations, but by this time the Tang emperor was merely a puppet figurehead of more powerful military governors. No response returned.

In 902, the dynasty came to a bloody end when the chief minister, Zheng Maisi, murdered the royal family and usurped the throne, renaming it to Dachanghe (大長和, 902–928). In 928, a White Mywa noble, Yang Ganzhen, aided Zhao Shanzheng in overthrowing the Zheng family, and establishing Datianxing (大天興, 928–929). The new regime lasted only a year before Zhao was killed by Yang, who created Dayining (大義寧, 929–937). Finally Duan Siping seized power in 937 and established the Dali Kingdom.

Military

Nanzhao had an elite vanguard unit called the Luojuzi, which means tiger sons, that served as full-time soldiers. For every hundred soldiers, the strongest one was chosen for service in the Luojuzi. They were outfitted with red helmets, leather armour, and bronze shields, but went barefoot. Only wounds to the front were allowed and if they suffered any wounds to their back, they were executed. Their commander was called Luojuzuo. The king's personal guards, known as the Zhunuquju, were recruited from the Luojuzi.

Government
Nanzhao society was separated into two distinct castes: the administrative White Mywa living in western Yunnan, and the militaristic Black Mywa in eastern Yunnan. The rulers of Nanzhao were from the Mengshe tribe of the Black Mywa. Nanzhao modelled its government on the Tang dynasty with ministries (nine instead of six) and imperial examinations. However the system of governance and rule in Nanzhao was essentially feudal. Sons of the Nanzhao aristocracy visited the Tang capital, Chang'an, to receive a Chinese education.

Sources that believe Nanzhao was a Yi dominated society also traditionally hold it to be a slave society because of how central the institution was to Yi culture. The prevalence of the slave culture was so great that sometimes children were named after the quality and quantity of slaves they owned or their parents wished to own. For example: Lurbbu (many slaves), Lurda (strong slaves), Lurshy (commander of slaves), Lurnji (origin of slaves), Lurpo (slave lord), Lurha, (hundred slaves), Jjinu (lots of slaves).

Language and ethnicity

Extant sources from Nanzhao and the later Dali Kingdom show that the ruling elite used Chinese script. Scriptures from Nanzhao unearthed in the 1950s show that it was written in the Bai language but Nanzhao does not seem to have ever attempted to standardize or popularize the script.

Leading families around the Nanzhao capital adopted Chinese surnames such as Yang, Li, Zhao, Dong, and claimed Han Chinese ancestry; however, the rulers instead presented themselves as Ailao descendants from Yongchang.

Bai and Yi
The ethnicity of Nanzhao's ruling elite is not clear. Both the Yi people and Bai people in modern Yunnan claim descent from Nanzhao's rulers.

In Weishan Yi and Hui Autonomous County, the Yi people claim direct descent from Xinuluo, the founder of Mengshe (Nanzhao).

The Bai people also trace their ancestry to Nanzhao and the Dali Kingdom, but records from those kingdoms do not mention Bai. "Bai barbarians" or "Bo people" were mentioned during the Tang dynasty and it is suspected that they might be the same name using different transcriptions; Bai and Bo were pronounced Baek and Bwok in the Tang period. The name Bo was first cited in the Lüshi Chunqiu (c. 241 and 238 BC) and appeared again in the Records of the Grand Historian (begun in 104 BC). The earliest references to "Bai people", or the "Bo", in connection to the people of Yunnan are from the Yuan dynasty. A Bai script using Chinese characters was mentioned during the Ming dynasty. Scriptures dated to the Nanzhao period used the Bai language. According to Stevan Harrell, while the ethnic identity of Nanzhao's ruling elite is still disputed, the subsequent Yang and Duan dynasties were both definitely Bai.

Forced migrations

The Nanzhao king Yimouxun (r. 779-808) conducted forced resettlement of several ethnicities.

Bamar
Nanzhao's invasions of the Pyu city-states brought with them the Bamar people (Burmese people), who originally lived in present-day Qinghai and Gansu. The Bamar would form the Pagan Kingdom in medieval Myanmar.

The earliest Bamar kings practiced the same patronymic naming tradition that the Nanzhao kings practiced: the last part of a father's name is used as the first part of the son's name.

Religion

Benzhuism
Almost nothing is known about pre-Buddhist religion in Nanzhao. According to Yuan dynasty sources, the Bai people practiced an indigenous religion called Benzhuism that worshiped local lords and deities. The Benzhu lords are spirits of people that died under special circumstances and are not hierarchically organized. Archaeological findings in Yunnan suggest that animal and human sacrifices were offered to the Benzhu lords around a metal pillar with the aid of bronze drums in return for wealth and health. The use of iron pillars for rituals seems to have been retained into the Dali Kingdom. The Nanzhao tuzhuan shows offerings to heaven occurring around one. The Bai people have female shamans and share a worship of white stones similar to the Qiang people.

Bimoism
Bimoism is the ethnic religion of the Yi people. The religion is named after the Shaman-priests known as bimo, which means 'master of scriptures', who officiate at births, funerals, weddings and holidays. One can become bimo by patrilinial descent after a time of apprenticeship or formally acknowledging an old bimo as the teacher. A lesser priest known as suni is elected, but bimo are more revered and can read Yi scripts while suni cannot. Both can perform rituals, but only bimo can perform rituals linked to death. For most cases, suni only perform some exorcism to cure diseases. Generally, suni can only be from humble civil birth while bimo can be of both aristocratic and humble families.

The Yi worshiped and deified their ancestors similar to the Chinese folk religion, and also worshiped gods of nature: fire, hills, trees, rocks, water, earth, sky, wind and forests. Bimoists also worship dragons, believed to be protectors from bad spirits that cause illness, poor harvests and other misfortunes. Bimoists believe in multiple souls. At death, one soul remains to watch the grave while the other is eventually reincarnated into some living form. After someone dies they sacrifice a pig or sheep at the doorway to maintain relationship with the deceased spirit.

Buddhism

Buddhism practiced in Nanzhao and the Dali Kingdom was known as Azhali (Acharya), founded around 821-824 by a monk from India called Li Xian Maishun. More monks from India arrived in 825 and 828 and built a temple in Heqing. In 839, an acharya named Candragupta entered Nanzhao. Quanfengyou appointed him as a state mentor and married his sister Yueying to Candragupta. It was said that he meditated in a thatched cottage of Fengding Mountain in the east of Heqing, and became an "enlightened God." He established an altar to propagate tantric doctrines in Changdong Mountain of Tengchong. Candragupta continued to propagate tantric doctrines, translated the tantric scripture The Rites of the Great Consecration, and engaged in water conservancy projects. He left for his homeland later on and possibly went to Tibet to propagate his teachings. When he returned to Nanzhao, he built Wuwei Temple.

In 851, an inscription in Jianchuan dedicated images to Maitreya and Amitabha. The Nanzhao king Quanfengyou commissioned Chinese architects from the Tang dynasty to build the Three Pagodas. The last king of Nanzhao established Buddhism as the official state religion. In the Nanzhao Tushu juan, the Nanzhao Buddhist elite are depicted with light skin whereas the people who oppose Buddhism are depicted as short and dark skinned.

Azhali is considered a sect of Tantrism or esoteric Buddhism. Acharya itself means guru or teacher in Sanskrit. According to Azhali practices among the Bai people, acharyas were allowed to marry and have children. The position of acharya was hereditary. The acharyas became state mentors in Nanzhao and held great influence until the Mongol conquest of China in the 13th century, during which the acharyas called upon various peoples to resist the Mongol rulers and later the Chinese during the Ming conquest of Yunnan. Zhu Yuanzhang banned the dissemination of Azhali Buddhism for a time before setting up an office to administer the religion.

The area had a strong connection with Tantric Buddhism, which has survived to this day at Jianchuan and neighboring areas. The worship of Guanyin and Mahākāla is very different from other forms of Chinese Buddhism. Nanzhao likely had strong religious connections with the Pagan Kingdom in what is today Myanmar, as well as Tibet and Bengal (see Pala Empire).

Gallery of Nanzhao rulers from the Kingdom of Dali Buddhist Volume of Paintings

Family tree of monarchs

References

Bibliography

 .

 (paperback).

.

Further reading 
 
 

738 establishments
902 disestablishments
Former monarchies of Asia
Former countries in Chinese history
Nanzhao
Vajrayana